Common names: speckled rattlesnake, Mitchell's rattlesnake, white rattlesnake

Crotalus mitchellii is a venomous pit viper species in the family Viperidae. The species is endemic to the Southwestern United States and adjacent northern Mexico. The species was named in honor of Silas Weir Mitchell (1829–1914), an American medical doctor who also studied rattlesnake venoms. Five subspecies are currently recognized, including the nominate subspecies described here.

Description
The race on Isla Ángel de la Guarda is known to become larger, the maximum recorded length for a specimen there being .

Geographic range
C. mitchelli is found in the southwestern United States and in northwestern Mexico. In the US, its range includes east-central and southern California, southwestern Nevada, extreme southwestern Utah, and western Arizona. In Mexico, it is native in most of Baja California, including Baja California Sur. It also inhabits a number of islands in the Gulf of California, including Angel de la Guarda Island, Carmen, Cerralvo, El Muerto, Espíritu Santo, Monserrate, Piojo, Salsipuedes, and San José, as well as on Santa Margarita Island off the Pacific coast of Baja California Sur.

The type locality is listed as "Cape St. Lucas, Lower California" (Cabo San Lucas, Baja California Sur, Mexico).

Subspecies and taxonomy

Grismer (1999) argued that C. m. angelensis and C. m. muertensis should be given species status, mainly due to differences in body size.
More recently, Douglas et al. (2007)  recognised C.m. stephensi as a full species, and Meik et al. (2015)  elevated both the southwestern and the Angel de la Guarda speckled rattlesnakes to the state of full species, C. pyrrhus and C. angelensis, whereas the El Muerto Island speckled rattlesnake was considered part of C. pyrrhus

Conservation status
The nominate subspecies (C. m. mitchellii ) is classified as "Least Concern" on the IUCN Red List of Threatened Species. The population trend was stable when assessed in 2007. Species are listed as such due to their wide distribution, presumed large population, or because they are unlikely to be declining fast enough to qualify for listing in a more threatened category.

References

Further reading
Cope ED (1861). "Contributions to the Ophiology of Lower California, Mexico and Central America". Proceedings of the  Academy of Natural Sciences of Philadelphia 13: 292-306. (Caudisona mitchellii, new species, pp. 293–294).

External links

Crotalus angelensis at San Diego Natural History Museum
Crotalus mitchelli at San Diego Natural History Museum
Crotalus mitchellii pyrrhus

mitchellii
Reptiles of the United States
Reptiles of Mexico
Fauna of the Southwestern United States
Fauna of the Sonoran Desert
Fauna of the Colorado Desert
Fauna of the Mojave Desert
Fauna of the California chaparral and woodlands
Natural history of Baja California
Taxa named by Edward Drinker Cope
Reptiles described in 1861